In baseball, charging the mound is an assault by a batter against the pitcher, usually the result of being hit by a pitch or nearly being hit by a pitch, such as a brushback. The first incidence of a professional charging of the mound has not been identified, but the practice dates back to the game's early days. Charging the mound is the most common initiator of a bench-clearing brawl.

Before charging, the batter usually throws his bat and helmet aside so that he may face the pitcher unarmed (it is a very serious breach of baseball etiquette, not to mention dangerous, for the batter to charge the mound with a bat and has resulted in criminal charges). Though serious injuries have occurred from charging in the past, usually fights are either broken up or joined by all other players so the conflict turns into posturing and name-calling; in baseball parlance, this is known as a rhubarb.

Charging the mound is typically about responding to an indignity rather than an attempt to injure the pitcher. There is long-standing etiquette in baseball regarding what is an acceptable offense to warrant a beaning, and there are similar unwritten rules for charging in response to being hit.  While these unwritten rules have become more vague, the response of Major League Baseball to the incidents has become far more strict. Whereas suspensions in the past were rare and usually short, Commissioner Fay Vincent and his successor Bud Selig reacted harshly to instances of both beaning and charging during their respective tenures.  Recently, most incidents which have caused the benches to clear under Rob Manfred's commissionership have been met with large fines and lengthy suspensions.

In Japan, pitchers tip their cap to a batter hit by a pitch if it was not their intent to hit the batter, to avoid a mound-charging incident.

References

External links

26-year-old Robin Ventura charges 46-year-old Nolan Ryan, a breakdown via YouTube 

Baseball terminology
Violence in sports
Major League Baseball controversies